Ganashakti Patrika (1967-present) is an Indian Bengali daily newspaper published from Kolkata, West Bengal, India. Initially the paper started as an organ of the Communist Party of India (Marxist) West Bengal State Committee.

History 
It first appeared as a fortnightly in 1967 and then it started as an evening daily for quite some time and finally converted  into a full-fledged daily newspaper. Presently Ganashakti has 3 editions in Kolkata, Durgapur and Siliguri having a daily circulation of less than 2,00,000. It's one of the founder was Ashok Gupta or Ramendranath Bhattacharya, who fought in Goa Liberation movement and he was a prominent Marxist leader of West Bengal. 

The principal catalyst behind transformation of Ganashakti was Saroj Mukherjee, a freedom fighter and CPI(M)'s state secretary during the 1980s. After Mukherjee's death his efforts were carried on by Anil Biswas. Ganashakti reached its highest circulation at the time of Biswas's editorship. Ganashakti trust is the owner of the Ganashakti newspaper. The present editor is Debashis Chakraborty.

References

External links
 Official website

Newspapers published in Kolkata
Bengali-language newspapers published in India
Communist Party of India (Marxist)
Newspapers established in 1967
1967 establishments in West Bengal